United Nations Security Council Resolution 2240 was adopted by the UN Security Council on 9 October 2015. Fourteen members of the Council voted in favor, while only Venezuela abstained. The proposal was brought to the council in response complaints by countries about migrant smuggling and human trafficking on the Libyan coast. It allowed countries on the Libyan coast to intercept and seize ships suspected of human smuggling.

Venezuela's reasoning for abstaining was that the resolution's plan would not solve the problem. In particular, the application of Chapter VII of the UN Charter of the humanitarian crisis would be a dangerous precedent, with the Security Council entering the waters through a loophole. The country also claimed that it was also necessary to solve the problems that drove people to look for safer places.

Background 
After the fall of the Colonel Qadhafi's regime in 2011, a new General National Congress was elected to govern Libya. A newly elected Islamist-dominated congress faced strong opposition. When the congress extended its own legislature in early 2014 objected to by the opposition, an army general started a military campaign. In September 2014, after armed opposition groups took control of Tripoli, there were armed clashes near the El Sharara oil field and the Zawiya refinery.  
Elections followed, and the Council of Representatives came to power. The Islamists were defeated in those elections but remained committed to the congress. Militias allied to both sides, the Islamists and the Islamic State, fought each other in a new civil war. Crimes, namely smuggling of migrants, some of whom left because of the war, and human trafficking, were facilitated by the state of conflict.

Content and implementation
The Convention against Transnational Organized Crime and its Protocol against the Smuggling of Migrants by Land, Air and Sea and the Protocol for the Prevention, Suppression and Punishment of Trafficking in Human Beings formed the legal basis for the fight against human trafficking. A significant controversy among this effort was the differentiation of migrant and human trafficking. It was also recognized that among those migrants were people who met the refugee definition set out in the 1951 Convention Relating to the Status of Refugees. The coalition stressed that any migrant, regardless of his or her status, should be treated humanely with regard to his or her rights.

The Libyan government was given responsibility to prevent the smuggling and trafficking of human beings across its territory and territorial waters. Other countries were also asked to assist in more effectively guarding the borders of Libya, specifically by monitoring the sea and airspace near the Libyan coast and, as international law allowed, to inspect ships and boats that did not fly a flag if they were suspected of smuggling people. For ships that did fly a flag, permission had to be obtained from the country whose flag was flown because countries had jurisdiction over their ships at sea. The countries were given permission for one year to inspect and, in the event of a violation, seize suspected ships. The state of the flag had to be notified of the incident.

References

2015 United Nations Security Council resolutions